Cobra Firearms, also known as Cobra Arms and officially as Cobra Enterprises of Utah, Inc. was an American firearms manufacturer based in Salt Lake City, Utah.

Cobra Firearms was distantly related to the "Ring of Fire" companies of inexpensive firearms makers  and may have been a reincarnation of Raven Arms and possibly Davis Industries.

Cobra Arms produced inexpensive handguns. Many firearms manufactured by Cobra Arms were constructed of injection-molded Zamak, a zinc alloy.

History
Cobra Enterprises of Utah, Inc. filed for chapter 7 bankruptcy February 24, 2020.

Derringer production was taken over by Bearman Industries.

Products
Cobra Arms primarily manufactured and sold pocket pistols and derringers in .22 LR, .32 ACP, and .380 ACP, however they also market larger handguns in 9mm Parabellum and .45 ACP.

All pistols are Zamak alloy unless otherwise noted:

Derringers
 Cobra Arms Classic series are constructed in .22LR, .22 WMR, .25 ACP, and .32 ACP,
 Cobra Arms Titan, a stainless steel derringer in .45 Long Colt and .410 bore,
 Cobra Arms Big Bore  and Long Bore Derringers  are constructed in .22 WMR, .32 H&R Magnum, .380 ACP, .38 Special, and 9mm, Long Bore are longer barrelled.

Semiautomatics
 Cobra Arms CA, pistols in .32 ACP or .380 ACP
 Cobra Arms Denali/New Denali Series pistols in .380 ACP
 Cobra Arms Freedom series are pistols in .32 ACP or .380 ACP 
 Cobra Arms Patriot Series, polymer pistols in .380 ACP, 9mm,. and 45 Auto  the Patriot series were acquired when Cobra Arms took over Republic Arms, a separate but related company.

Revolvers
 Cobra Arms Shadow .38 Special lightweight Snubnosed revolver with a polymer frame and stainless steel barrel and cylinder.

See also

 Jimenez Arms
 Phoenix Arms
 Raven Arms
Davis Industries

References

External links
Official site
PBS History of the companies
Brandon's Arms, About Bryco and Bruce Jennings

Firearm manufacturers of the United States
Manufacturing companies based in Salt Lake City
Privately held companies based in the Las Vegas Valley